Longuich is a municipality in the Trier-Saarburg district, in Rhineland-Palatinate, Germany. It lies on the river Moselle.
A part of Longuich is Kirsch.

References

Municipalities in Rhineland-Palatinate
Trier-Saarburg